Carol + 2 is the second of a multi-year series of variety television specials starring Carol Burnett, aired on CBS network in the United States between 1962 and 1989. The first special, Julie and Carol at Carnegie Hall, was aired in 1962. It featured Burnett and Julie Andrews. On March 22, 1966, Carol + 2 aired, in which Carol was joined by actor Zero Mostel and comedien  Lucille Ball.[1]

Cast
 Carol Burnett as Herself / Various Characters
 Lucille Ball as Herself / Various Characters
 Zero Mostel as Himself / Various Characters

Production
The variety / sketch comedy was directed by Marc Breaux. The inclusion of Ball was partly because CBS insisted on Burnett having an established co-star for the special, and also because Ball already had a contract with CBS for up to three specials (in addition to her regular sitcom The Lucy Show) for the 1966–67 season, of which she would only produce one (Lucy in London).

Release
On March 22, 1966, Carol + 2 aired on CBS. The variety / sketch comedy was such a critical and ratings success that CBS rebroadcast it on January 15, 1967. Carol + 2 was released on DVD on May 17. 2016. In April 2016, MeTV broadcast the special for the first time in 50 years.

References

Notes
1 A complete listing of the specials can be found with Burnett's other television work under Carol Burnett. Data is from Carol Burnett: The Special Years (CBS, 1994).

Citations

External links
 

1960s American variety television series
Carol Burnett